Pipes and Pints are a Celtic punk band from Prague, Czech Republic which formed in 2006. Their sound combines punk rock with Highland bagpipes. Their album Found & Lost won best album in the Punk and Hardcore category at the 2012 Anděl Awards.

Members 
 Vojta Kalina – Highland bagpipes, vocals
 Ivo "Rafan" Traxmandl – Guitar, vocals
 Lukas Vincour – Drums, vocals
 Travis O'Neill – Lead vocals
 Ondra Balvin – Bass, vocals

Discography

Studio albums
Until We Die - Unrepentant Records/Wolverine Records - 2009-2014 / Fly High Booking - 2015-now
Found & Lost - Supraphon Records/People Like You Records - 2012
The Second Chapter - Fly High Booking - 2019

Singles 
 "Karma Killer" - Fly High Booking - 2018
 "Dark into the Night" - Fly High Booking  - 2018
 "Rebel in my Veins" - Fly High Booking  - 2018
 "Raise our Flag" - Fly High Booking  - 2017

EPs
EP 2008 - Self-released - 2008

Compilation albums
Die Ox-CD No. 87 - Ox-fanzine - 2009
Saints and Sinners - Wolverine records - 2009
Punk Rock Potluck Vol. 3 - PunkRockReview.org - 2009
Almost St. Patrick's Day Vol. 2 - 2009

References

External links
Official Website

Czech punk rock groups
Celtic punk groups
Musical groups established in 2006
2006 establishments in the Czech Republic